Anzela Abbasi is a Pakistani actress, model and singer who works in Urdu Television. She is the daughter of actors Shamoon Abbasi and Javeria Abbasi and the paternal granddaughter of writer Zubair Abbasi. Abbasi made her debut in acting by playing the leading lady in the serials Gila (2016), Baby (2017) and Main Haar Nahi Manoun Gi (2018).

Personal life 
Abbasi is the daughter of  Pakistani actor Shamoon Abbasi and actress Javeria Abbasi

Filmography

Television

References

External links

21st-century Pakistani actresses
University of Karachi alumni
Pakistani television actresses
Living people
Year of birth missing (living people)